Daudov is a Russian masculine surname. Its feminine counterpart is Daudova. It may refer to:
Ibragimkhalil Daudov (1960–2012), Dagestani militant
Magomed Daudov (born 1980),  Military and political figure of the Chechen Republic
Marat Daudov (born 1989), Ukrainian football player

Russian-language surnames